The Roman Catholic Diocese of Nicolet (erected 10 July 1885) is a suffragan of the Archdiocese of Sherbrooke, Quebec, Canada.

Cathedral

The seat of the bishop (or "ordinary") is the Cathedral of St. Jean-Baptiste, a spectacular building opened in 1963, which seats 1,200 worshippers and features extensive stained glass as well as other artwork by a number of local artists. The present building is the fifth cathedral, successor to four previous buildings that fell victim to various physical disasters: two collapses, a fire, and damage from the Nicolet landslide of 1955. A frieze of stained glass in the apse shows characters from the Bible and from the history of the Christian church, including a portrait of Bishop Martin, who was responsible for construction of the new building.

Bishops

Ordinaries
Elphège Gravel (1885 – 1904)
Joseph-Simon-Herman Brunault (1904 – 1937)
Albini Lafortune (1938 – 1950)
Joseph Albertus Martin (1950 – 1989)
Raymond Saint-Gelais (1989 – 2011)
André Gazaille (2011 – 2022)
Daniel Jodoin (2022 – )

Coadjutor bishops
 Joseph-Simon-Herman Brunault (1899-1904)
 Joseph Albertus Martin (1950)
 Raymond Saint-Gelais (1988-1989)

Other priest of this diocese who became bishop
 Joseph-Roméo Gagnon, appointed Bishop of Edmundston, New Brunswick in 1949

Bibliography

External links
 Roman Catholic Diocese of Nicolet Official Site

Nicolet
Nicolet
Nicolet
1885 establishments in Canada
Nicolet, Quebec